Infinity Systems is an American manufacturer of loudspeakers founded in Los Angeles in 1968 and headquartered in Stamford, Connecticut. Since 1983, Infinity has been part of Harman International Industries, which became a subsidiary of Samsung Electronics in 2017.

Infinity produces packages for a range of audio applications, including multichannel surround sound home theatre packages, in-wall home speakers, and marine applications. Other products include powered subwoofers and car audio amplifiers.

Infinity products are installed as an option on Hyundai and Kia vehicles, some Mitsubishi vehicles from the 1990s to 2006, and many Chrysler vehicles.

History 
Founded in 1968 by Arnie Nudell, John Ulrick and Cary Christie, Infinity has produced home and mobile audio products by employing innovative materials such as neodymium magnets, mylar diaphragms, and polypropylene cones. The company's first product was the Servo-Static speaker system which, as the.
Infinity had a ownership relationship with Eastern Air Devices, later known as EAD. This involved the consumer brand of KLH speakers, and Avid< Perrless drivers, and Kyocera/Cybernet (which produces electronics)
In the late 1970s Infinity introduced the EMIT (electromagnetic induction tweeter) and EMIM (electromagnetic induction midrange) drivers. These were flat quasi-ribbons that worked to move air based on the principle of electromagnetic induction. The system used samarium–cobalt magnets, allowing for a very low ribbon driver mass-per-unit area. Variants were made, such as the EMIT-R (radial emit), the S-EMIT (super emit) and the L-EMIM (large emim). The IRS (Infinity Reference System) was an ultra-high end system, selling at US$65,000 in the 1980s. It consisted of 72 EMIT tweeters, 24 EMIM midrange drivers, and twelve 12-inch polypropylene woofers in four towers.

Nudell left to form Genesis Technologies, a high-end loudspeaker company, founded in Seattle in 1991. Genesis' original flagship system, the 1.2, retailed for US$235,000, and is basically an updated Infinity IRS system.

Since the departure of Nudell, Infinity speaker designs have taken a more mass market oriented approach. The efficient SM (Studio Monitor) series incorporated a polycell tweeter and graphite impregnated midrange/woofers. While not as elaborate or high end as previous Infinity efforts, they filled a popular consumer niche.

Notes

External links 

 

Electronics companies established in 1968
Harman International
In-car entertainment
Loudspeaker manufacturers
1968 establishments in California
Companies based in Stamford, Connecticut
1983 mergers and acquisitions